Laḫmu ( or , d laḫ-mu) is a class of apotropaic creatures from Mesopotamian mythology. While the name has its origin in a Semitic language, Lahmu was present in Sumerian sources in pre-Sargonic times already.

Iconography and character 
Laḫmu is depicted as a bearded man wearing a red garment (tillû) and usually with six curls on his head.  Some texts mention a spade as the attribute of Lahmu. The artistic representations are sometimes called "naked hero" in literature. 

Lahmu were associated with water. They were generally believed to be servants of Enki/Ea (and later on of his son Marduk as well), and were described as the doorkeepers of his temple in Eridu and possibly as the "guardians of the sea" known from some versions of Atra-hasis. Some texts list as many as 50 Lahmu in such roles. It's possible they were originally river spirits believed to take care of animals, both domestic and wild. 

Apotropaic creatures such as Lahmu weren't regarded as demonic, and in fact protected the household from demons, though myths may depict them as defeated and subsequently reformed enemies of the gods. At the same time, they weren't viewed as fully divine, as their names were rarely, if ever, preceded by the dingir sign ("divine determinative") and they do not wear horned tiaras (a symbol of divinity) in art.

In apotropaic rituals Lahmu was associated with other monsters, for example Mushussu, Bashmu (a type of mythical snake), Kusarikku (bison-men associated with Shamash) or Ugallu.

As a cosmological being 
In god lists a singular  Lahmu sometimes appears among the ancestors of Anu, alongside a feminine counterpart (Lahamu), following the primordial pair Duri and Dari (eternity) and other such figures and preceding Alala and Belili. Assyriolgist Frans Wiggermann, who specializes in the study of origins and development of Mesopotamian apotropaic creatures and demons, assumes that this tradition had its origin in northern Mesopotamia. Lahmu and Lahamu aren't necessarily siblings in this context. Long lists of divine ancestors of Enlil or Anu from some god lists were at least sometimes meant to indicate that the gods worshiped by the Mesopotamians weren't the product of incestuous relationships.

In Enuma Elish, compiled at a later date and relying on the aforementioned tradition, Lahmu is the first-born son of Abzu and Tiamat. He and his sister Laḫamu are the parents of Anshar and Kishar, parents of Anu and thus ancestors of Ea and Marduk according to this specific theogony. Both of them bestow 3 names upon Marduk after his victory. However, Lahmu - presumably of the same variety as the apotropaic rather than cosmological one - also appears among Tiamat's monsters.

A fragmentary Assyrian rewrite of Enuma Elish replaced Marduk with Ashur, equated with Anshar, with Lahmu and Lahamu replacing Ea/Enki and Damkina. Wilfred G. Lambert described the result as "completely superficial in that it leaves the plot in chaos by attributing
Marduk's part to his great-grandfather, without making any attempt to iron out the resulting confusion."

Disproven theories 

19th and early 20th century authors asserted that Lahmu represents the zodiac, parent stars, or constellations.

References

Sources 
Michael Jordan, Encyclopedia of Gods, Kyle Cathie Limited, 2002
Black, Jeremy and Green, Anthony, Gods, Demons and Symbols of Ancient Mesopotamia, University of Texas Press, Austin, 2003.

Mesopotamian gods
Offspring of Tiamat
Characters in the Enūma Eliš